Auer may refer to:

People 
 Auer (surname)

Places and rivers
 Germany
 Auer (Odenwald), a river in the Hessian Odenwald
 Auer Bach, a river of North Rhine-Westphalia, tributary of the Wupper
 Auer Mühlbach, a river in Bavaria, branch of the Isar
 Italy
 Auer, South Tyrol, a municipality in South Tyrol
 Poland
 German name of Urowo

Other uses 
 Auer v. Robbins, a United States Supreme Court case
 Auer rod, cytoplasmic inclusions
 Auer Dult, a traditional annual market in Munich, Germany
 Auer+Weber+Assoziierte, a German architecture firm
 Auergesellschaft, a Berlin-based industrial firm